Depok is a landlocked city in West Java province, and located within Jakarta metropolitan area in Indonesia. It has an area of 200.29 km2. It had a population of 1,738,600 at the 2010 Census and 2,056,400 at the 2020 Census, resulting in a density of 10,267 people per km2. Depok was declared as a separate city on 20 April 1999, having previously been part of Bogor Regency.

History 
Depok word is an acronym of De Eerste Protestantse Organisatie van Christenen. There is also a saying that the word "depok" itself comes from Sundanese meaning hermitage or abode of one living in seclusion.

On 18 May 1696, a former VOC officer Cornelis Chastelein bought the land with an area of 12.44 km2, 6.2% the area of today's Depok. Besides cultivating the area with industrial plants with the help of the locals, Chastelein was active as a missionary, preaching Christianity to the indigenous Indonesians. To this end, he established a local congregation named De Eerste Protestante Organisatie van Christenen (DEPOC). Although the Sundanese name Depok, meaning hermitage or abode of one living in seclusion, was already in existence before the establishment of the congregation, some insist the acronym might have been the origin of the city's name. Today the majority of Depok's population are adherent of Islam, except for the majority of the original Depok family.

Before his death on 28 June 1714, Chastelein had written a will that freed the slave families of Depok and gave them pieces of his land, converting slaves into landlords.
In 1714, the 12 slave families became landlords (forever as given to them with entitlement deeds of the owner Chastelien in his will) and freed men, women, and children.
The freed slaves are also referred to as the Mardijker's – the word Merdeka meaning freedom in Bahasa Indonesia.  June 28 is designated as Depokse Daag (Depok Day)  by the original Depok family, and on 28 June 2014, commemorating 300 years, they formally opened a 3-meter height monument on its own land, but it was prohibited by the Government as it referred to Dutch colonialization.

The 12 original Depok family names are:

 Bacas
 Isakh
 Jacob
 Jonathans
 Joseph
 Laurens
 Leander
 Loen
 Sadokh
 Samuel
 Soedira
 Tholense

The original slave families of Depok are of Balinese, Ambonese, Buginese, Sundanese and Portuguese Indo, i.e., Mestizo and Mardijker descent. Isakh, Jacob, Jonathans, Joseph, and Samuel were family names baptized by Chastelein after the slave families converted to Protestant Christianity. The other families retained their original names and might have been (Roman Catholic) Christian already before joining Chastelein's Protestant church. Descendants of the original Depok families with the exception of the Sadokh family, still live in Indonesia, the Netherlands, Norway, Canada and the United States.

In 1871, the colonial government gave Depok a special status allowing the area to form its own government and president. The ruling no longer stood after 1952, where the Depok presidency ceded its control of Depok to the Indonesian government except for a few areas.

During the Bersiap (Indonesian civil war and war for independence from The Netherlands) period of 1945 much of Depok was destroyed and many of its inhabitants killed by 'Pemuda'. Many of the original Depok families fled for their lives from Indonesia during the Indonesian revolution and now live in the Netherlands as part of the Indo community there.

In March 1982, Depok was reclassified as an administrative city within Bogor Regency and, in 1999, as a city headed by a mayor. Then on 20 April 1999, the city of Depok was unified with some neighbouring districts of Bogor Regency to form an autonomous city of Depok (independent of the Regency) with an area of 200.29 km2. This date is commemorated as the date of the establishment of the city.

Administration 

Depok is headed by a mayor, with a legislative assembly. Both the mayor and the members of the legislative assembly are elected by direct vote.

Mayors 
 Mochammad Rukasah Suradimadja (1982–1984)
 Mochammad Ibid Tamdjid (1984–1988)
 Abdul Wachyan (1988–1991)
 Moch Masduki (1991–1992)
 Sofyan Safari Hamim (1992–1996)
 Badrul Kamal (1997–2005)
 Warma Sutarman (acting) (2005–2006)
 Nur Mahmudi Ismail (2006–2016)
 Arifin Harun Kertasaputra (acting) (2016)
 Mohammad Idris (2016–present)

Administrative districts 

The city of Depok is divided into eleven districts (kecamatan), tabulated below with their areas and their populations at the 2010 Census and the 2020 Census. The table also includes the number of administrative urban villages (kelurahan) in each district and its postal codes.

Demographics

Languages

In Depok there are also areas where the majority of the people speak Sundanese, namely Leuwinanggung in Tapos district and there are also several other districts whose people speak Sundanese language, like in Cimanggis and Cilodong.

Facilites

Shopping and dining 
Depok has a growing eclectic collection of malls and traditional markets. Older malls or other notable shopping centers include D'mall Depok, Ciplaz Depok, and SixtyOne Building, and ITC Depok. Depok has many local restaurants and has wide presence of international chains such as A&W Restaurant, Burger King, CFC, Kentucky Fried Chicken, McDonald's, Pizza Hut, Starbucks, Domino's Pizza, Subway, Wendy's, Carl's Jr., Wingstop, Popeyes, Krispy Kreme, J.CO Donuts, BreadTalk, Yoshinoya, Marugame Udon, HokBen, Chatime, The Coffee Bean & Tea Leaf, Baskin Robbins, Dairy Queen, and Dunkin Donuts.

Modern-day landmarks that were once known as Depok's primary shopping centers include Ramanda (now an autoshop plus education centre), Hero Supermarket (now Index Home Furnishings) etc.

There are many shopping centers in Depok, such as:
 ITC Depok (anchor tenant: Carrefour)
 Depok Town Square — commonly referred to as DeTos (anchor tenant: Matahari and Hypermart)
 Margo City (anchor tenants: Centro, Farmers Market, Electronic City)
Pesona Square (anchor tenants: Centro, Hypermart, Ace Hardware)
D'mall Depok (anchor tenant: Electronic Solution)
Depok Town Center
City Plaza Depok
Cinere Mall
Cinere Bellevue Mall
Cimanggis Square
Trans Studio Mall Cibubur (anchor tenants: Metro and Transmart)
The Park Sawangan shopping mall

Traditional markets include Pasar Depok Baru, Pasar Depok Lama (short: Pasar Lama), Pasar Kemiri (originally expanded to facilitate the move of Pasar Lama traders), Pasar PAL, Pasar Agung, Pasar Musi, Pasar Cisalak, and Pasar Majapahit.

Parks
Alun Alun Depok or Depok Square is equipped with various sports facilities such as a basketball court, futsal, skateboard, wall climbing, BMX arena, children's playground, fish pond, fountain, and others. Godongijo Conservation and Education Park is located in Depok. The park provides children and teachers alike the ability to get up close and personal with nature. There are also other children's amusement parks in the city such as Depok Fantasi Waterpark, Taman Pemuda Pratama, and Pondok Zidane.

Education

The following universities are in Depok:
 University of Indonesia
 
 
 Jakarta State Polytechnic
 
 Muhammadiyah University of Depok
 
Depok has several private language schools, namely EF English First, Kinderfield Highfield Depok, International Language Programs (ILP), Lembaga Indonesia Amerika (LIA), The British Institute (TBI), Lembaga Pendidikan Indonesia - Amerika (LPIA), and several other smaller establishments. These are all along Margonda Raya and Cinere Raya, the two main roads that pass through Depok. In Depok City itself, for Madrasah Tsanawiyah (MTs) there are around 72 schools.

Sports

Depok is the home town of the Persikad Depok and Depok United FC football team who currently plays in the Liga 2.

Transportation

Toll road access

Public transportation

Angkot is the major means of public transportation in Depok. Go-Jek and Grab and taxicabs are easily available. Depok is connected to other areas of greater Jakarta by commuter train, TransJakarta & Kopaja buses. Depok Lama, Depok Baru Station, Universitas Indonesia Station, Pondok Cina Station and Citayam Station of KRL Jabodetabek commuter train service located within Depok. Commuter train is widely used to travel to Jakarta city center and other parts of Greater Jakarta, but is very crowded during peak hours.

Air

Depok is served by Soekarno-Hatta International Airport and Halim Perdanakusuma International Airport. Meanwhile Pondok Cabe Airport is located at South Tangerang in borders with Depok, but doesn't have regular scheduled air service.

Twin towns – sister cities

Depok is twinned with:

 Ōsaki, Kagoshima Prefecture, Japan
 Calabanga, Camarines Sur, Philippines

See also

 Depok Lama, the old town of Depok
 List of twin towns and sister cities in Indonesia
 2020 Depok mayoral election

References

External links 

 
Jakarta Globe

 
Populated places in West Java
1871 establishments in the Dutch Empire